El Morocco (sometimes nicknamed Elmo or Elmer) was a 20th-century Manhattan nightclub frequented by the rich and famous from the 1930s until the decline of café society in the late 1950s. It was famous for its blue zebra-stripe motif (designed by Vernon MacFarlane) and its official photographer, Jerome Zerbe.

History
In 1931, John Perona (born Enrione Giovanni Perona in Chiaverano in the Province of Turin, Italy), an Italian immigrant, with Martín de Alzaga opened El Morocco as a speakeasy at 154 East 54th Street, on the south side of 54th Street in the middle of the block between Lexington Avenue and Third Avenue, where the Citigroup Center now stands.

After prohibition was repealed, it became one of the most popular establishments in New York City. Its regular clientele consisted of fashionable society, politicians, and entertainers. Lucille Ball and Desi Arnaz had their wedding reception here. Part of what made the club the 'place to be' was the photographs taken by Jerome Zerbe which were always in the news the next day. Everyone always knew from the background zebra stripes on the banquettes where the celebrities had been.

The neighborhood started changing after World War II, and eventually Perona moved El Morocco to a four-story townhouse at 307 East 54th Street, on the north side of the street near the corner of Second Avenue, in 1960.

Perona died in 1961, and his son, Edwin took over the proprietorship. Later that year, Edwin Perona sold the club to John Mills, who owned it for three years. It was then owned by Maurice Uchitel (1964–70) and Sheldon Hazeltine. Before taking over El Morocco, Uchitel owned the Eden Roc Hotel in Miami Beach for several years. In 1981, the Second Avenue wing operated briefly as a steakhouse. In 1992, it operated as a topless bar. In 1997, Desmond Wootton bought the property and opened the Night Owls nightclub. The site is now occupied by the Milan Condominium.

In popular culture
The club was included in the 1955 movie My Sister Eileen starring Janet Leigh and Jack Lemmon. 

 The club is a setting for a scene in the 1973 Arthur Laurents film The Way We Were. Katie Morosky spots a nodding-off Hubbell Gardiner at the bar, and a flashback ensues.
 A fictionalized version of the club featuring distinctive zebra striped banquettes is featured in the Woody Allen movie Cafe Society (2016). The club is referenced by name in Woody Allen's movie Radio Days (1987).
 John Perona, billed as the club's "owner and operator," appeared as a mystery guest on What's My Line on April 6, 1958. The particular panel included, along with three regular panelists, Orson Welles. Perona himself was so well known that the panelists were blindfolded and he disguised his voice, following the show's custom with readily identifiable guests.
 Allen Cooper takes Anne Welles to El Morocco in the 1966 novel Valley of the Dolls by Jacqueline Susann.

References
Citations

Bibliography

External links
"Ghosts of El Morocco", Laura Shaine Cunningham, The New York Times, September 4, 2004
Angelo Zuccotti, 89, Artist of the Velvet Rope, Thomas, Robert, Jr., The New York Times, August 12, 1998
Nights on the Town, Taki Theodoracopulos, National Review, December 13, 1993
Photos of El Morocco
Photos of El Morocco
 Friday Night Fever: El Morocco
El Morocco Slideshow-New York Daily News May 4, 2008

1931 establishments in New York City
Defunct drinking establishments in Manhattan
Nightclubs in Manhattan
Midtown Manhattan